The Heinkel HE 10 was a trainer floatplane developed by the German aeronautical company Heinkel Flugzeugwerke in the late 1920s.

Development
The Heinkel HE 10 was a monoplane trainer seaplane based on the HE 6. 

On September 4, 1929, an HE 10 flying near Warnemünde could not reduce its speed and crashed into the dam. The two pilots were seriously injured while the three passengers managed to land alone.

Specifications

References

HE 10
Single-engined tractor aircraft
Monoplanes
Aircraft first flown in 1928